Putyatinsky (masculine), Putyatinskaya (feminine), or Putyatinskoye (neuter) may refer to:

Putyatinsky District, a district of Ryazan Oblast, Russia
Putyatinsky (rural locality), a rural locality (a settlement) in Kemerovo Oblast, Russia
Putyatinskaya, a rural locality (a village) in Arkhangelsk Oblast, Russia